William Mitten (30 November 1819 – 20 July 1906), was an English pharmaceutical chemist and authority on bryophytes who has been called "the premier bryologist of the second half of the nineteenth century".

He built up a collection of some 50,000 specimens of bryophytes (mosses, lichens and liverworts) at his birthplace and home in Hurstpierpoint, Sussex. The collection was largely made up of specimens collected around the world by other collectors and is now at the New York Botanical Garden, having been purchased after his death. These collectors included Richard Spruce and also Alfred Russel Wallace, who became Mitten's son-in-law in 1866.

He had four daughters: Annie, the eldest, was the only one to marry;  
another, Flora, provided assistance in compiling notes for William Edward Nicholson to write a  sketch with bibliography  on her father.

References

Sources

English botanists
1819 births
1906 deaths